Sentimental Journey to the Potato Country is a 1986 Soviet romance film directed by Dmitry Dolinin.

Plot 
The film tells about a young man who, after successfully entering the institute, goes to the village "to the potato" and there he meets new and interesting people and a girl whom he loves.

Cast 
 Filipp Yankovsky
 Anzhelika Nevolina
 Pyotr Semak
 Andrey Gusev
 Vasili Arkanov
 Nikolai Ustinov		
 Yevgeniya Barkan	
 Fyodor Valikov
 Elvira Kolotukhina	
 Sergey Russkin

References

External links 
 

1986 films
1980s Russian-language films
Soviet romance films
Soviet teen films